The Club Deportivo Audaz Octubrino is a professional football team from the city of Machala in Ecuador. Its stadium is called "9 de Mayo" and has a capacity of about 10,000 people. In Copa America 1993 it staged some group stage games.
 
The best ever success for Audaz came about in the 1987– season being its president Teofilo Oyola Cevallos, when they finished 3rd in the Ecuadorian league, only losing out to Barcelona (Guayaquil) and Filanbanco (Milagro, Guayas). That season Audaz was renowned as especially strong at home, beating, among others, El Nacional, Barcelona and Emelec. Audaz Octubrino won the Ecuadorian B-league in 1998 and then played one season in the premier league. Since then it didn't do too well.

In March 2006 the club ceased to exist due to financial problems, having been in debt of more than 130,000 US dollars. The city of Machala was left without professional soccer team for the first time since the foundation of Audaz in 1948.

For the season 2007 the club was reformed, and now plays in the provincial "second division" of El Oro province, a third-level league.

Forward Eduardo Hurtado played for Audaz Octubrino in the season 2004–2005.

Audaz Octubrino, Club Deportivo
Audaz Octubrino, Club Deportivo
Audaz Octubrino, Club Deportivo
Audaz Octubrino, Club Deportivo
1948 establishments in Ecuador
2006 disestablishments in Ecuador
2007 establishments in Ecuador
Machala